The Wild Wadi Water Park is an outdoor water park in Dubai, United Arab Emirates. Situated in the area of Jumeirah, next to the Burj Al Arab and the Jumeirah Beach Hotel, the water park is operated by Jumeirah International, a Dubai-based hotelier.

Wild Wadi has a heated/cooled wave pool, multiple water slides and two artificial surfing machines.  The park once had the largest water slide outside of North America, but it has since been removed to make space for two other rides.  Another feature of the park is an  waterfall that goes off every ten minutes. The water park also has two gift shops, three restaurants and two snack stands.

It was featured in The Amazing Race 5 and The Amazing Race Asia 1, in which teams had to slide down a  drop. It was later featured in The Amazing Race Australia 2, but instead, the teams had to ride the Surf Machine and use boogie boards to surf their way to the end where they got their next clue.

Rides
Ring Rides are the traditional downhill slides. Riders can choose to sit in either a single or double ring.

Tantrum Alley & Burj Surj are two new slides that replaced the family rides. Both are the first of its kind in the region. Tantrum Alley is a slide with a combination of 3 tornados & Burj Surj has 2 bowls.

Jumeirah Sceirah is the tallest and fastest free-fall water slide outside of North and South America.

FlowRider rides, Wipeout and Riptide, are surfing simulators that shoot out more than seven tons of water per second in a thin sheet across moulded foam structures. These rides produce a realistic wave effect which allows riders to body-board, knee-board or surf.

Breakers Bay is the largest wave pool in the Middle East.  It produces parallel and crossing  waves in five different configurations.

Juha’s Dhow and Lagoon is Wild Wadi's play area for children and has over 100 water games/rides.

Wipeout AND Riptide have only four of its kind in the world. It is devised by the maverick American lawyer/surf fanatic Thomas Lochtefeld, the Wipeout working by releasing seven tones of water in a second on a thin sheet, which is molded by a foam structure. In this way it produce a fantastic wave effect which is ideal for body-boarding and knee-boarding (or surfing during private parties).

Ticketing and Rates 
The price of tickets in the Wild Wadi water park is based on the height of the person. It is separated into two categories: those above and below 1.1 metres tall. There are discounts on booking tickets in advance from the website. Moreover, children under the age of two are free to enter with proof of age. There are charges for towel and lockers if required.

See also

List of parks in Dubai

References

External links 

Parks in Dubai
Water parks in the United Arab Emirates
1990s establishments in the United Arab Emirates
Amusement parks in Dubai
Amusement parks in the United Arab Emirates